Eva Lindström (born 1952) is a Swedish illustrator and author. Her work is known for its humorous and dark style.

Life
Lindström was born in Västerås in 1952. She attended the art school Konstfack in Stockholm from 1969 to 1974, where she studied painting and was part of a radical political activist group. The origin of her more radical and dark art style is attributed to this time period. She began her career in the 1980s as a cartoonist. Her first book was Katmössan (The Cat Hat), which she wrote and illustrated. In 1996, she published her second book Lurix. She is known for her children's books, such as Berättesler om Mats Och Roj (Somebody Moves In—Stories About Mats and Roj) (2002) and Olli Och Mo (Olli and Mo) (2012).

Style
Lindström's illustrations are often created using watercolor with gouache or pencil. The Nordic Council Children and Young People's Literature Prize nomination text described her work as "often funny and clever as well as having an existential depth."

Selected works
The Cat Hat (1989)
Olli och Mo (Olli and Mo)
Snöret, fågeln och jag (Little String, the Bird, and Me) (2013)
My Dog Mouse (2017), Gecko Press 
Everyone Walks Away (2019), Gecko Press

Awards and honors
Elsa Beskow Plaque, 1993
BMF Plaque, 2001
Expressen’s Heffaklump, 2002
En Bok För Alla's Literary Humor Prize, 2003
Snöbollen's Best Picture Book of the Year, 2012
August Prize, 2013 for Snöret, fågeln och jag with Ellen Karlsson
Shortlist for the Hans Christian Andersen Award, 2014
Astrid Lindgren Memorial Award, 2022

References

External links

Informative illustrated biography of Eva Lindström by Ulla Rhedin from the International Board on Books for Young People (IBBY)

1952 births
Living people
Konstfack alumni
People from Västerås
Swedish children's book illustrators
Swedish women children's writers
Swedish children's writers
Swedish women illustrators
Swedish illustrators
August Prize winners
20th-century Swedish women artists
20th-century Swedish artists
20th-century Swedish women writers
21st-century Swedish women artists
21st-century Swedish artists
21st-century Swedish women writers